The Mienic or Yao languages are spoken by the Yao people of China, Vietnam, Laos, and Thailand.

Some of the Yao peoples speak Hmongic languages (Miao); these are called Bunu. A small population of Yao people in Jinxiu Yao Autonomous County (金秀瑶族自治县) in eastern Guangxi speak a Tai-Kadai language called Lakkia. Other Yao peoples speak various Sinitic (Chinese) language varieties.

Classification
Mienic is one of the primary branches of the Hmong–Mien language family, with the other being Hmongic.

Ratliff (2010)
Martha Ratliff (2010:3) proposed the following classification:

Mienic
Iu Mien, 840,000 speakers
Kim Mun, 400,000 speakers
Biao Min, 43,000 speakers
Dzao Min, 60,000 speakers

Strecker (1987)
Strecker 1987, followed (with the addition of Moxi) by Matisoff 2001, proposed the following, with some of the more divergent varieties as additional languages:

 Mienic (Yao)
 Biao–Jiao:
 Biao Min
 Chao Kong Meng
 Moxi
 Mian–Jin:
 Biao Mon
 Iu Mien
 Kim Mun
 Zaomin: Dzao Min

Luang-Thongkum (1993)
Luang-Thongkum (1993:170) proposes the following classification for Mjuenic, a proposed branch consisting of the Mien, Mun, and Muen (Biao Mon) languages. The classifications of Biao Min and Dzao Min are not addressed.

Proto-Mjuenic
Mun
West Mun (Landian Yao 蓝靛瑶)
East Mun (Shanzi Yao 山子瑶)
(Mien-Muen)
Muen (Ao Yao 坳瑶)
Mien (Pan Yao 盘瑶)
North Mien
East Mien, West Mien

Mao (2004)
Mao Zongwu (2004) classifies the Mienic languages varieties of China as follows. Data points studied in Mao (2004) are also listed for each dialect.

Mien 勉: 550,000 speakers
Guangdian 广滇 dialect: 400,000 speakers
Dapingjiang, Jianxin village, Jiangdi township, Longsheng County (龙胜县江底乡建新村大坪江屯)
Shinongjiao village, Daxiaohe township, Guanyang County (灌阳县大小河乡石弄脚村)
Xianjiacao, Liuding village, Sanjiao township, Jinxiu County (金秀县三角乡六定村仙家槽屯)
Fengle village, Panshi township, Rongjiang County (榕江县盘石乡丰乐村)
Miaozhu village, Gongkeng township, Ruyuan County (乳源县公坑乡苗竹村)
Shuizi'ao village, Liangchahe township, Jianghua County (江华县两岔河乡水子坳村)
Yanbian village, Shilixiang township, Jinping County (云南省红河哈尼族彝族自治州金平苗族瑶族傣族自治县十里香乡百岩边村)
Xiangnan 湘南 dialect: 130,000 speakers
Miaoziyuan village, Xiangjiang township, Jianghua County (湖南永州市江华瑶族自治县湘江乡庙子源村)
Ganziyuan village, Mianhuaping township, Ningyuan County (湖南省永州市宁远县棉花坪乡柑子园村)
Luoxiang 罗香 (Ao Biao 坳标) dialect: 3,000 speakers
Luoxiang township, Jinxiu County (广西来宾市金秀瑶族自治县罗香乡罗香村)
Changping 长坪 (Biao Man 标曼) dialect: 20,000 speakers in the counties of Mengshan, Pingdong, Zhaoping, and Lipu
Dongpingdong village, Changping township, Mengshan County (广西壮族自治区梧州市蒙山县长坪乡东坪垌村)
Jinmen 金门: 220,000 speakers
Diangui 滇桂 dialect: 166,000 speakers
Xinzhai village, Liangzi township, Hekou County (云南省红河哈尼族彝族自治州河口瑶族自治县梁子乡新寨村)
Nacai village, Dulong township, Malipo County (云南省文山麻栗坡县都龙乡那才村)
Suoshanjiao village, Yaoqu township, Mengla County (云南省勐腊县瑶区乡梭山脚村)
Lanjin township, Lingyun County (广西壮族自治区百色市凌云县览金乡览金村)
Xintun, Jiajiang village, Sanjiao township, Jinxiu County (广西壮族自治区来宾市金秀瑶族自治县三角乡甲江村新屯)
Fanghai 防海 dialect: 60,000 speakers
Tansan township, Fangcheng District (广西壮族自治区防城县十万大山区滩散乡滩散村)
Xin'an village, Daping township, Qiongzhong County (海南省琼中黎族苗族自治县大平乡新安村)
Biao Min 标敏: 40,000 speakers
Dongshan 东山 dialect: 35,000 speakers
Shuanglong, Huanglong village, Dongshan township, Quanzhou County (全州县东山乡黄龙村双龙屯)
Shikou 石口 dialect: 8,000 speakers
Shikou village, Sanjiang township, Gongcheng County (恭城县三江乡石口村)
Niuweizhai 牛尾寨 dialect:  2,000 speakers
Niuwei village, Sanjiang township, Gongcheng County (恭城县三江乡牛尾村)
Zao Min 藻敏: 60,000 speakers
Daping township, Liannan County (连南县大坪乡大坪村)

A Mienic lect called bjau2 mwan2 ("Biao Man 标曼"), related to Mien of Changping and Luoxiang, is spoken in Liuchong 六冲, Qiaoting Township 桥亭乡, Pingle County 平乐县, Guangxi (Tang 1994); another "Biao Man 标曼" dialect is spoken in Dongpingdong 东坪洞 (Tang 1994). There are about 10,000 speakers in Mengshan, Lipu, Pingle, and Zhaoping counties.

The comparative vocabulary chart in Mao Zongwu (2004) consists of the following languages.
Guangdian Mien (Jiangdi); autonym: 
Diangui Kim Mun (Liangzi); autonym: 
Dongshan Biao Min; autonym: 
Daping Dzao Min; autonym: 
Xiangnan Mien (Miaoziyuan); autonym: 
Changping Mien ( = Biao Mon); autonym: 
Luoxiang Mien; autonym: 
Fanghai Kim Mun (Tansan); autonym: 
Shikou Biao Min ( = Chao Kong Meng); autonym: 
Niuweizhai Biao Min ( = Moxi); autonym:

Aumann & Sidwell (2004)
Using Mao's (2004) new data, Aumann & Sidwell (2004) propose the following classification of the Mienic languages, based on innovations in rhotic consonants. This classification presents a bipartite division of the Mienic into a subgroup consisting of Iu Mien and Biao Min, and another subgroup consisting of Kim Mun and Dzao Min. Luoxiang is grouped with Kim Mun, while Changping is grouped with Dzao Min.

Proto-Mien
Mien-Biao Min
Guangdian Mien
Xiangnan Mien
Biao Min
Dongshan
Shikou
Mun-Dzao
Luoxiang-Kim Mun
Luoxiang Mien
Kim Mun
Changping-Dzao Min
Changping Mien
Dzao Min

Aumann & Sidwell (2004) consider the following classification by Wang & Mao to be unlikely, which is based on the voicing of voiceless sonorants, a common areal feature.

Proto-Mien
Luoxiang Mien
Iu Mien
Guangdian Mien
Xiangnan Mien
Dongshan Biao Min
Mun-Dzao
Shikou Biao Min
Kim Mun
(Branch)
Changping Mien
Dzao Min

Taguchi (2012)
Yoshihisa Taguchi's (2012) computational phylogenetic study classifies the Mienic languages as follows.

Hsiu (2018)
Hsiu's (2018) computational phylogenetic study classifies the Mienic languages as follows.

Mienic
Zao Min
Greater Biao Min
Biao Min (Dongshan)
Biao Min (Guanyang)
Moyou (Shikou)
Moxi (Niuweizhai)
Greater Biao Mon
Biao Mon (Changping Mien)
Biao Mwan (Luoxiang Mien) (?)
Kim Mun
Iu Mien

Hsiu (2018) considers Changping Mien to have been influenced by Kim Mun lects due to geographical proximity, although it retains many unique forms that indicate it should belong in its own branch.

Mixed languages
Some languages may be mixed Chinese and Mienic (Yao) languages, such as:

Various Lowland Yao languages (平地瑶话) that are unclassified Sinitic languages, such as:
 Yeheni
 Younian
Shaozhou Tuhua, the language of the nüshu script, is an unclassified variety of Chinese spoken by ethnic Yao. Its origin is obscure, but it may have started out as a Sinicized Mienic language.
Shehua, spoken mostly in Zhejiang and Fujian

Numerals

See also
 List of Proto-Mienic reconstructions (Wiktionary)
 Hmong-Mien comparative vocabulary list (Wiktionary)

References

Mao Zongwu [毛宗武]. 2004. A study of Mien dialects [Yao zu Mian yu fang yan yan jiu 瑤族勉语方言研究]. Beijing: Ethnic Publishing House [民族出版社].

Further reading
Li, Yunbing [李云兵]. 2018. Miaoyaoyu bijiao yanjiu [苗瑶语比较研究]. Beijing: The Commercial Press [商务印书馆]. 
Liu, Wen [刘文]. 2021. Yaoyu fangyan lishi bijiao yanjiu [瑶语方言历史比较研究]. Beijing: Social Sciences Literature Press [社会科学文献出版社]. 
Liu, Wen [刘文]. 2020. Yaoyu fangyan qinyuan fenqun yanjiu [瑶语方言亲缘分群研究]. In: Journal of Zaozhuang University [枣庄学院学报] 6: 6-17.

Sources with word lists of Mienic languages
Đoàn Thiện Thuật; Mai Ngọc Chừ. 1992. Tiếng Dao. Hà Nội: Nhà xuất bản khoa học xã hội.
Duan Shanshu [段善述]; Mei Yuzhu [梅玉诸]; Pan Meihua [盘美花] (ed). 2013. Yao languages of Vietnam [越南瑶语]. Beijing: Ethnic Publishing House [民族出版社]. 
Liu Hongyong [刘鸿勇] (2016). Yuebei Ruyuan Guoshan Yao Mianyu yanjiu [粤北乳源过山瑶勉语研究]. Beijing: Wenhua yishu chubanshe [文化艺术出版社].
Phan Hữu Dật & Hoàng Hoa Toàn. 1998. "Về vấn đề xác minh tên gọi và phân loại các ngành Dao Tuyên Quang." In Phan Hữu Dật (ed). Một số vấn đề về dân tộc học Việt Nam, p. 483-567. Hà Nội: Nhà xuất bản Đại Học Quốc Gia Hà Nội. [Comparative word list of 9 Dao dialects in Tuyen Quang Province from p. 524-545]
Sun Yelin [孙叶林] (2013). Xiangnan Yaoyu he Hanyu fangyan de jiechu yu yingxiang yanjiu: yi Hengyang Changning Tashan Yaozuxiang wei ge an 湘南瑶语和汉语方言的接触与影响研究——以衡阳常宁塔山瑶族乡为个案.
Tan Xiaoping [谭晓平]. (2012). Yuyan jiechu yu yuyan yanbian: Xiangnan Yaozu Jiangyong Mianyu ge an yanjiu 语言接触与语言演变——湘南瑶族江永勉语个案研究. Wuhan: Huazhong Normal University Publishing House 华中师范大学出版社.
Zheng Zongze [郑宗泽] (2011). Jianghua Mianyu yanjiu [江华勉语研究]. Beijing: Ethnic Publishing House [民族出版社].

Hmong–Mien languages
Languages of China
Languages of Laos
Languages of Thailand
Languages of Vietnam